D.E. Bowen (fl. 1840-80), was a Welsh Baptist minister, serving in Pennsylvania, U.S.A. He was also an editor and author. He was born in Glamorganshire, Wales, but moved to the US at a young age. He was well known as the editor of Y Gwyliedydd, the first periodical published by the Welsh Baptists in the United States in 1843, and Y Seren Orllewinol, which succeeded it the following year.

He also published 'The Berean; or Miscellaneous Writings of the Reverend D.E. Bowen, Carbondale, Pa. (Carbondale, n.d.); a Lecture on the Life and Genius of the Reverend John Williams, Senior Pastor of the Oliver Street Baptist Church, New York (New York, n.d.)'.

References 

Baptist ministers from the United States
Year of birth missing
Year of death missing